Maria Pavlidou (born 20 January 1978) is a Greek former professional tennis player.

A right-handed player from Thessaloniki, Pavlidou spent much of her early career playing college tennis in the United States for the University of Arkansas. She was an All-American in 1999 when she became the first female Arkansas player to reach the quarterfinals of an NCAA singles championships.

Pavlidou represented Greece in the Fed Cup from 2000 to 2003, featuring in a total of five singles and four doubles rubbers. She also competed for Greece at the Mediterranean Games, winning a gold medal in Tunis in 2001, as partner of Eleni Daniilidou in the women's doubles.

ITF finals

Singles: 2 (0–2)

Doubles: 11 (5–6)

References

External links
 
 
 

1978 births
Living people
Greek female tennis players
Mediterranean Games gold medalists for Greece
Mediterranean Games medalists in tennis
Competitors at the 2001 Mediterranean Games
Sportspeople from Thessaloniki
Arkansas Razorbacks women's tennis players
College women's tennis players in the United States